This is a List of places visited by Ibn Battuta in the years 1325–1353.

The Moroccan traveller Ibn Battuta set out from his native town of Tangiers on a pilgrimage to Mecca in June 1325, when he was 21 years old. On completing his first hajj he continued travelling, only returning to Morocco twenty four years later in 1349. In 1350, Battuta visited Al-Andalus and then between 1352-1353 he crossed the Sahara Desert to visit the Kingdom of Mali in West Africa. On his return to Fes he dictated an account of his travels to Ibn Juzayy, a scribe employed by Abu Inan Faris, the Marinid ruler of Morocco.

Ibn Juzayy's Arabic text was translated into English by Hamilton Gibb and Charles Beckingham and published by the Hakluyt Society in four volumes between 1958 and 1994.

Places visited by Ibn Battuta

In the following list the Romanization used by Gibb and Beckingham is given in parentheses. The states are modern. Within each section the towns are listed in the order that they are first mentioned in Ibn Battuta's rihla. Historians such as Hamilton Gibb and Ross Dunn have argued that some parts of Ibn Battuta's rihla are fictional and it is extremely unlikely that he visited all the places that he claimed. The cities for which Ibn Battuta's visit is believed to be fictional are flagged as "doubtful" in the list below.

Maghreb

 Tangier, Morocco
 Tlemcen (Tilimsān), Algeria
 Miliana (Milyāna), Algeria
 Algiers (al-Jazā'ir), Algeria
 Béjaïa (Bijāya), Algeria
 Constantine (Qusanṭīna), Algeria
 Annaba (Būna), Algeria 
 Tunis, Tunisia
 Sousse (Sūsa), Tunisia
 Sfax (Ṣafāqus), Tunisia
 Gabès (Qābis), Tunisia
 Tripoli (Aṭrābulus), Libya
 Taza (Tāzā), Morocco
 Fes (Fās), Morocco
 Ceuta (Sabta), Spain
 Marrakech (Marrākush), Morocco
 Salé (Salā), Morocco
 Meknes (Miknāsa), Morocco
 Sijilmasa (Sijilmāsa), Morocco

Mashriq

 Alexandria (al-Iskandarīya), Egypt
 Damanhur (Damanhūr), Egypt
 Fuwwah (Fawwā), Egypt
 Ibyar (Abyār), Egypt 
 El-Mahalla El-Kubra (al-Maḥalla al-Kabīra), Egypt
 Damietta (Dimyāt), Egypt
 Faraskur (Fāriskūr), Egypt
 Sebennytos or Samannoud (Samannūd), Egypt
 Cairo (Miṣr), Egypt 
 Biba (Biba), Egypt 
 Oxyrhynchus (al-Bahnasa), Egypt
 Minya (Munyat Ibn Khaṣīb), Egypt
 Mallawi (Manlāwī), Egypt
 Manfalut (Manfalūṭ), Egypt
 Asyut (Asyūṭ), Egypt
 Akhmim (Ikhmīm), Egypt
 Hu (Hū), Egypt
 Qena (Qinā), Egypt
 Qus (Qūṣ), Egypt
 Luxor (al-Aqṣur), Egypt
 Esna (Asnā), Egypt
 Edfu (Adfū), Egypt
 ‘Aydhab (‘Aidhāb), Egypt
 Bilbeis (Balbais), Egypt
 Gaza (Ghazza), Gaza Strip, Palestine
 Hebron (al-Khalīl), West Bank, Palestine
 Bethlehem (Bait Laḥm), West Bank, Palestine
 Jerusalem (al-Quds), Palestine 
 Ramla (al-Ramla), Palestine 
 Nablus (Nābulus ), West Bank, Palestine
 Ajloun (‘Ajlun), Jordan
 Tyre (Sūr), Lebanon
 Sidon (Ṣaidā), Lebanon
 Tripoli (Aṭrābulus), Lebanon
 Hama (Ḥamāh), Syria
 Aleppo (Ḥalab), Syria
 Antioch (Antākiya), Turkey
 Bagras (Bughrās), Turkey
 Latakia (al-Lādhiqīya), Syria
 Baalbek (Ba‘labakk), Lebanon
 Damascus, Syria
 Al-Kiswah (al-Kiswa), Syria
 Al Karak (Al-Karak), Jordon
 Ma'an (Ma‘ān), Jordon

Arabian Peninsula

 Tabuk (Tabūk), Saudi Arabia
 Medina (al-Madīna), Saudi Arabia
 Rabigh (Rābigh), Saudi Arabia
 Mecca, Saudi Arabia
 Jeddah (Judda), Saudi Arabia
 Zabīd (Zabīd), Yemen
 Jibla (Jubla), Yemen
 Ta'izz (Ta'izz), Yemen
 Sana'a (Ṣan'ā'), Yemen Doubtful.
 Aden ('Adan), Yemen
 Salalah (Zafāri), Oman
 Qalhat (Qalhāt), Oman
 Nizwa (Nazwā), Oman
 Bahrain (al-Baḥrain), Bahrain Adjacent shore.
 Qatif (al-Quṭaif), Saudi Arabia
 Hofuf or al-Hasa (Hajar), Saudi Arabia
 Al-Yamama (al-Yamama), Saudi Arabia

Iran and Iraq

 Najaf (al-Najaf), Iraq
 Basra (al-Basra), Iraq
 Abadan ('Abbādān), Iran
 Bandar-e Mahshahr (Māchūl), Iran
 Ramhormoz (Rāmiz), Iran
 Shushtar (Tustar), Iran
 Izeh (Īdhaj), Iran
 Isfahan (Iṣfahān), Iran
 Shiraz (Shīrāz), Iran
 Kazerun (Kāzarūn), Iran
 Kufa (al-Kūfa), Iraq
 Hillah (al-Ḥilla), Iraq
 Baghdad (Baghdād), Iraq
 Tabriz (Tabrīz), Iran
 Mosul (al-Mawṣil), Iraq
 Cizre (Jazīrat Ibn 'Omar), Turkey
 Sinjar (Sinjār), Iraq
 Mardin (Mārdīn), Turkey
 Hormuz (New Hurmuz), Iran
 Lar (Lār), Iran

East Africa

 Suakin (Sawākin), Sudan
 Zeila (Zaila'), Somalia
 Mogadishu (Maqdashaw), Somalia
 Mombasa (Mambasā), Kenya
 Kilwa (Kulwā), Tanzania

Anatolia

Alanya (al-‘Alāyā), Turkey
Antalya (Anṭāliya), Turkey
Burdur (Burdūr), Turkey
Isparta (Sabartā), Turkey
Eğirdir (Akrīdūr), Turkey
Gölhisar (Qul-Ḥiṣār), Turkey
Laodicea on the Lycus near Denizli (Lādhiq), Turkey
Tavas (Ṭawās), Turkey
Muğla (Mughla), Turkey
Milas (Mīlās), Turkey
Konya (Qūniya), Turkey
Karaman (al-Lāranda), Turkey
Aksaray (Aqsarā), Turkey
Niğde (Nakda), Turkey
Kayseri (Qaisarīya), Turkey
Sivas (Sīwās), Turkey
Amasya (Amāṣiya), Turkey
Uluköy (Sūnusā), Turkey
Gümüşhane (Kumish), Turkey
Erzincan (Arzananjān), Turkey
Erzurum (Arz al-Rūm), Turkey
Birgi (Birgī), Turkey
Tire (Tīra), Turkey
Selçuk (Ayā Sulūq), Turkey
İzmir (Yazmir), Turkey 
Manisa (Maghnīsīya), Turkey
Bergama (Barghama), Turkey
Balıkesir (Balī Kasrī), Turkey
Bursa (Burṣā), Turkey
İznik (Yasnīk), Turkey
Geyve (Kāwiya), Turkey
Taraklı (Yanijā), Turkey
Göynük (Kainūk), Turkey
Mudurnu (Maṭurnī), Turkey
Bolu (Būlī), Turkey
Gerede (Garadai), Turkey
Safranbolu (Burlū), Turkey
Kastamonu (Qaṣṭamūniya), Turkey
Sinop (Ṣanūb), Turkey
Constantinople, Turkey

Central Asia

 Feodosia (al-Kafā), Ukraine/Russia
 Stary Krym (al-Qiram), Ukraine/Russia
 Azov (Azāk), Russia
 Majar (al-Māchar), Russia
 Pyatigorsk (Bish Dagh), Russia
 Bolghar (Bulghār), Russia Very doubtful.
 Astrakhan (al-Ḥājj Tarhān), Russia
 New Sarai (al-Sarā), Russia
 Sarayshyk (Sarāchūq), Kazakhstan
 Konye-Urgench (Khwārizm), Turkmenistan
 Bukhara (Bukhārā), Uzbekistan
 Qarshi (Nakhshab), Uzbekistan
 Samarkand (Samarqand), Uzbekistan
 Termez (Tirmidh), Uzbekistan
 Balkh (Balkh), Afghanistan
 Herat (Harāt), Afghanistan Doubtful.
 Torbat-e Jam (al-Jām), Iran Doubtful.
 Tus (Ṭūs), Iran Doubtful.
 Nishapur (Naisābūr), Iran Doubtful.
 Bastam (Bisṭām), Iran Doubtful.
 Kunduz (Qundūz), Afghanistan
 Ghazni (Ghazna), Afghanistan
 Kabul (Kābul), Afghanistan

South Asia

 Uch (Ūja), Pakistan
 Multan (Multān), Pakistan
 Abohar (Abūhar), India
 Pakpattan (Ajudahan), Pakistan
 Sirsa (Sarasatī), India
 Hansi (Ḥānsī), India
 Delhi (Dihlī), India
 Aligarh (Kuwil), India
 Kannauj (Qinauj), India
 Gwalior (Guyālyur), India
 Ujjain (Ujain), India
 Daulatabad (Dawlat Ābād), India
 Khambhat or Cambay (Kinbāya), India
 Gandhar (Qandahār), India 
 Honnavar (Hinawr), India
 Mangalore (Manjarūr), India
 Kannur or Cannanore, India
 Kozhikode or Calicut (Qāliqūt), India
 Kollam or Quilon (Kawlam), India
 Malé (Mahal), Maldives
 Puttalam (Baṭṭāla), Sri Lanka
 Adam's Peak (Sarandīb), Sri Lanka
 Dondra Head (Dīnawar), Sri Lanka
 Chittagong, Bangladesh or possibly Satgaon, India (Sudkāwān) Identification of Sudkāwān uncertain.
 Sonargaon (Sunarkāwān), Bangladesh

Southeast Asia

 Samudera Pasai Sultanate (Sumuṭra), Northern Sumatra, Indonesia Exact location uncertain.

China

 Quanzhou (Zaitūn), China
 Guangzhou or Canton (Ṣīn al-Ṣīn), China
 Fuzhou (Qanjanfū), China Uncertain.
 Hangzhou (al-Khansā), China Doubtful.
 Beijing (Khān Bāliq), China Doubtful.

Al-Andalus

 Gibraltar (Mountain of Victory), United Kingdom
 Ronda (Runda), Spain
 Marbella (Marbala), Spain
 Málaga (Málaga), Spain
 Granada (Gharnāṭa), Spain

Mali Empire and West Africa

 Taghaza (Taghāzā), Mali
 Oualata (Īwālātan), Mauritania
 Timbuktu (Tunbuktū), Mali
 Gao (Kaukau), Mali
 Takedda (Takaddā), Niger
 Tuat (Tawāt), Algeria

Itinerary 1325–1332

Itinerary 1332–1346

Itinerary 1349–1353

References

Sources
 . First published in 1986, .
 
 
 
  This volume was translated by Beckingham after Gibb's death in 1971. A separate index was published in 2000.

Lists of places
Exploration of Africa
Exploration of Asia